Buck Creek is a hamlet in central Alberta, Canada within Brazeau County. The first school opened in 1934.

Demographics 
The population of Buck Creek according to the 2005 municipal census conducted by Brazeau County is 107.

See also 
List of communities in Alberta
List of hamlets in Alberta

References 

Brazeau County
Hamlets in Alberta